Non-Fiction is the sixth studio album by American recording artist Ne-Yo. The album was released on January 27, 2015, by Motown Records, serving as the follow-up to his fifth album R.E.D. (2012). The album was preceded by two singles: "Money Can't Buy" featuring Jeezy and "She Knows" featuring Juicy J.

Upon its release, the album was met with mixed reviews from music critics. The album reached number five on the US Billboard 200, selling 59,000 copies in its first week, making it the third album to miss the pinnacle of the chart since Libra Scale (2010) and also becoming the second male R&B artist to have six consecutive top 10 albums following Chris Brown in 2014.

Singles
"Money Can't Buy" featuring Jeezy was released via digital download on May 29, 2014, as the first single from Non-Fiction in North America; it was later sent to US urban contemporary radio on June 3, 2014. The song peaked at number 17 on the US Bubbling Under Hot 100 Singles chart, a listing of the top twenty-five songs that have yet to enter the main Hot 100, while charting at number 41 on the US Hot R&B/Hip-Hop Songs chart.

"She Knows" featuring Juicy J was released via digital download on September 16, 2014, as the album's lead single (second overall) in North America; it was sent to US urban contemporary, rhythmic, and contemporary hit radio. The single reached number 19 on the US Billboard Hot 100, while charting at number six on the US Hot R&B/Hip-Hop Songs chart, number two on the US Rhythmic Songs chart, and number 19 on the US Pop Songs chart.

"Time of Our Lives" with Pitbull was released via digital download on November 17, 2014, as the fifth single from Pitbull's album, Globalization, while also appearing on Non-Fiction; it was sent to US rhythmic radio on December 12, 2014. It became the best-performing release from Non-Fiction, peaking at number nine on the US Billboard Hot 100. It also peaked at number one on the US Rhythmic Songs chart and at number four on the US Pop Songs chart. The song performed moderately in international markets, peaking within the top twenty in Canada and New Zealand, while charting within the lower regions of charts in Australia, Ireland, and the United Kingdom. Its music video was released on December 25, 2014.

"Coming with You" was sent to mainstream radio stations in the United States on April 14, 2015, as the fourth official single after being issued as the first international single in February.

Promotional singles
In promotion for the album's release, several songs were released via iTunes Store as promotional singles in the weeks leading up to the album's release. "Coming with You" was released as the first on January 5, 2015. "Religious" and "Who's Taking You Home" followed on January 13, 2015,  with "Religious" serving as the second international promotional single and the latter as the second in North America.

Critical reception

The album was met with mixed reviews from music critics. At Metacritic, which assigns a "weighted average" rating out of 100 from selected independent ratings and reviews from mainstream critics, the album received an average score of 60, which indicates "mixed or average reviews", based on 12 reviews. Andy Kellman of AllMusic highlighted the tracks "She Knows" and "One More" for being "tough but finely crafted slow jams" and the more uptempo "Coming with You" for being "a dazzling Stargate production like no other that contains a hip-house core and soars", saying that Non-Fiction "contains more standouts than any Ne-Yo album since Because of You." In a review for Exclaim!, Del F. Cowie wrote that the record was "indicative of an underlying need to placate his various audiences," further explaining that Non-Fiction "delivers an uneven synthesis of the sounds Ne-Yo had already been exploring rather than the promised straight up R&B record." Rolling Stones Chuck Arnold felt that Ne-Yo had trouble keeping up the overall concept of the record and said the tracks influenced by Michael Jackson ("Coming with You") and Marvin Gaye ("Integrity") are where he performs better than the ones with more modern leanings.

Commercial performance
The album debuted at number five on the US Billboard 200, selling 59,000 copies in its first week. The album opened at the top spot of the R&B/Hip-Hop Albums chart. , the album sold over 108,000 in the US.

In 2015, Non-Fiction was ranked as the 140th most popular album of the year on the Billboard 200.

Track listing

Notes
 signifies an additional producer
 signifies a vocal producer
 signifies a co-producer
"Run" contains interpolations from "From Nowhere" as performed by Dan Croll, and written by Croll and Joe Wills.
"Money Can't Buy" contains elements from "Nothing Can Stop Me" as performed by Marilyn McCoo and Billy Davis, Jr., and written by Tony Hester. Contains interpolations from "Be Thankful for What You Got" as written and performed by William DeVaughn.
"She Said I'm Hood Tho" samples a portion of "Do I Stand a Chance" as performed by The Montclairs, and written by Philip Eugene Perry.

Charts

Weekly charts

Year-end charts

References

2015 albums
Ne-Yo albums
Motown albums
Albums produced by Honorable C.N.O.T.E.
Albums produced by Stargate
Albums produced by Dr. Luke
Albums produced by Cirkut
Albums produced by David Banner
Albums produced by Mono/Poly